The 1848 United States presidential election in Arkansas took place on November 7, 1848, as part of the 1848 United States presidential election. Voters chose three representatives, or electors to the Electoral College, who voted for President and Vice President.

Arkansas voted for the Democratic candidate, Lewis Cass, over Whig candidate Zachary Taylor. Cass won Arkansas by a margin of 10.14%.

Results

See also
 United States presidential elections in Arkansas

References

Arkansas
1848
1848 Arkansas elections